Ishirkov Crag (‘Ishirkov Kamak’ \i-'shir-kov 'ka-m&k\) is the rocky peak rising to 1490 m in Arkovna Ridge, Aristotle Mountains on Oscar II Coast in Graham Land.  It surmounts Crane Glacier to the northwest and Mapple Glacier to the southeast.  The feature is named after the Bulgarian geographer Anastas Ishirkov (1868-1937), in connection with the settlement of Profesor Ishirkovo in Northeastern Bulgaria.

Location
British mapping in 1976.

Maps
 British Antarctic Territory.  Scale 1:200000 topographic map.  DOS 610 Series, Sheet W 65 62.  Directorate of Overseas Surveys, Tolworth, UK, 1976.
 Antarctic Digital Database (ADD). Scale 1:250000 topographic map of Antarctica. Scientific Committee on Antarctic Research (SCAR). Since 1993, regularly upgraded and updated.

Notes

References
 Ishirkov Crag. SCAR Composite Antarctic Gazetteer.
 Bulgarian Antarctic Gazetteer. Antarctic Place-names Commission. (details in Bulgarian, basic data in English)

External links
 Ishirkov Crag. Copernix satellite image

Mountains of Graham Land
Oscar II Coast
Bulgaria and the Antarctic